Rathnan Prapancha is a 2021 Indian Kannada-language comedy drama film written and directed by Rohit Padaki and produced by Karthik and Yogi G Raj under the banner KRG Studios. The film stars Dhananjay, Malayalam actress, Reba Monica John in her Kannada debut, Panju, Umashree, Ravishankar Gowda,  It is released directly on the digital platform Amazon Prime Video on 22 October 2021. 
It receive positive reviews from critics and audience and was a streaming blockbuster on Amazon Prime Video

Plot 
Rathnakara is an insurance agent in Bangalore, who is awaiting his transfer order to Mumbai and lives a dull life with his cunning and irritating mother Saroja. One day, Rathnakara learns from a journalist Mayuri that he was adopted as an infant by Saroja and leaves his home to find his real world. During the Journey, Rathnakara realizes that blood relations are not important, but the one who took care of us lovingly is important in our life. Rathnakara calls Saroja, only to find that she died from a heart attack, thus leaving him devastated. Rathnakara leaves for his home and cancels his transfer order to live with his family in remembrance of Saroja.

Cast

Production
Rathnan Prapancha is shot in various locations like Bangalore, Mysore, Kashmir, and Gadag

Soundtrack

Release 
The satellite and digital rights were secured by Zee Kannada and Amazon Prime Video, where the film was released on 22 October 2021 in Amazon Prime Video.

Awards

References

External links
 

2021 films
2020s Kannada-language films
Film productions suspended due to the COVID-19 pandemic
Films shot in Bangalore
Films shot in Jammu and Kashmir
Films shot in Karnataka
Films shot in Mysore
Amazon Prime Video original films